{{Infobox album|
| name       = Cancer
| type       = Album
| artist     = My Disco
| cover      = My Disco - Cancer album art.jpg
| alt        =
| released   = November 7, 2006
| recorded   =
| venue      =
| studio     =
| genre      = Math rock, minimalist
| length     = 24:56
| label      = Numerical Thief / Stomp
| producer   =
' link
| prev_title =
| prev_year  =
| next_title = Paradise
| next_year  = 2008
| misc       = 
}}Cancer''''' is an album by My Disco, released on November 7, 2006. The album marked a change in direction for the band, further into math rock, shifting towards minimalism, a theme further explored and refined in the following album Paradise. The album was recorded in mid-2006.

The album was released through Numerical Thief. It was also released on vinyl.

Many of the song titles and lyrics relate to a general cancer diagnosis and treatment theme.

Track listing
All songs written by My Disco.
 "Perfect Protection"
 "A Marker"
 "Calling Cure"
 "Always Measure Wait"
 "Pale"
 "Patterns Surgical
 "St."
 "Administer A Prosthetic Dream"

References

2006 albums
My Disco albums